Khangura  is a village in Phagwara tehsil in Kapurthala district of Punjab State, India. The village is administrated by a Sarpanch who is an elected representative of village.

Transport
Phagwara Junction and Mauli Halt are the closest railway stations to Khangura. Phagwara, Jandiala , Jalandhar, Phillaur are the nearby cities to Khangura village.

References

External links
  Villages in Kapurthala
 Kapurthala Villages List

Villages in Kapurthala district